The Bangladeshi national cricket team visited Pakistan in August to September 2003 and played a three-match Test series against the Pakistani national cricket team. Pakistan won the Test series 3–0. Bangladesh were captained by Khaled Mahmud and Pakistan by Rashid Latif. In addition, the teams played a five-match Limited Overs International (LOI) series which Pakistan won 5–0.

Test series summary
 1st Test at National Stadium, Karachi – Pakistan won by 7 wickets
 2nd Test at Arbab Niaz Stadium, Peshawar – Pakistan won by 9 wickets
 3rd Test at Multan Cricket Stadium, Multan – Pakistan won by 1 wicket

References

2003 in Bangladeshi cricket
2003 in Pakistani cricket
Bangladeshi cricket tours of Pakistan
International cricket competitions in 2003–04
Pakistani cricket seasons from 2000–01